Rothsay is an abandoned town in the Mid West region of Western Australia. It is situated between the towns of Dalwallinu and Mount Magnet

A prospector named George Woodley discovered gold in the area in 1894 and initially the area was known as Woodley's Find.Within a year all of the leases had been pegged and in 1895 Woodley sold his claim to a Scottish mining company. The local progress association requested that a townsite be declared in 1897 and it was gazetted in 1898. Later the same year the population of the town was 140, 110 males and 30 females.

In its heyday the town had a population of over 500 people. Later the town fell into decline but experienced a second lease of life when the entrepreneur Claude de Bernales reopened the mine in 1932. Today the town is abandoned but remnants of the strong room, the mine manager's house and the derelict shaft are all that remain.

The town is thought to have been named after the Scottish town of  Rothesay on the Isle of Bute, on the coast of the Firth of Clyde. The different spelling is likely to have been a mistake made either by the progress association or the Lands Department.

See also
Karara mine

References 

Shire of Perenjori
Ghost towns in the Mid West of Western Australia